The Solicitor-General of Queensland, known informally as the Solicitor-General, is the state's Second Law Officer, and the deputy of the Attorney-General. The Solicitor-General can exercise the powers of the Attorney-General in their absence. The Solicitor-General acts alongside the Crown Advocate and Crown Solicitor, and serves as one of the legal and constitutional advisers of the Crown and its government in the Australian state of Queensland. 

The Solicitor-General is addressed in court as "Mr/Ms Solicitor". Despite the title, the position may only be filled by a barrister of at least ten years standing, for a period of five years. The inaugural Solicitor-General was Thomas Byrnes, who served from 12 August 1890 to 13 March 1893. The position was then vacant until 1922, when William Webb was appointed. The current Solicitor-General  is Gavin Thompson.

History and function 
The relevant Solicitor-General Act 1985 (Qld) (the Act) provides for the office of Solicitor-General. The Act provides for an appointment for a term not exceeding five years, with the possibility of renewal. A candidate for Solicitor-General must be a barrister of no less than 10 years. The Act provides the functions of the Solicitor-General are to act primarily for the Crown, state, or other person as requested by the Attorney-General for the benefit of the Government of Queensland.

Office-holders 1890-present

References 

Solicitors-General of Queensland
Queensland law